The 1954–55 SK Rapid Wien season was the 57th season in club history.

Squad

Squad and statistics

Squad statistics

Fixtures and results

League

References

1954-55 Rapid Wien Season
Rapid